Feriz or Fariz or Feris may refer to:
 Feriz, Birjand, South Khorasan
 Feriz, Khusf, South Khorasan
 Feriz Morgh, South Khorasan
 Feriz Nuk, South Khorasan
 Feriz Beg, 15th/16th century Ottoman military officer, Sanjak-bey of the Sanjak of Scutari and Sanjak of Bosnia.
 Feriz, Bayramören